Enshirah Al-Hyasat (born 25 November 1991) is a Jordanian footballer who currently plays as a defender.

External links 
 

Living people
Jordanian women's footballers
Jordan women's international footballers
Women's association football defenders
Footballers at the 2006 Asian Games
Footballers at the 2010 Asian Games
Footballers at the 2014 Asian Games
Jordanian women's futsal players
1991 births
Asian Games competitors for Jordan